Persatuan Sepakbola Gunung Jati Cirebon or PSGJ Cirebon is a football club based in Sumber, Cirebon Regency, West Java. Established in 1962. They currently play at Liga 3 and their homebase is Ranggajati Stadium. Their main rival are PSIT Cirebon.

Players

Current squad

Honours
 Liga 3 West Java Series 2
 Runner-up: 2022

References

External links
 

Football clubs in Indonesia
Football clubs in West Java
Association football clubs established in 1962
1962 establishments in Indonesia